The OHL Executive of the Year Award was given annually to the top executive in the Ontario Hockey League, whose team demonstrates success both on the ice, and at the administration level. It was first awarded in 1989–90 OHL season. The most recent winner, Mike Vellucci is the first person in OHL history to be named both executive and coach of the year in the same season. The awarded has not been given out since 2013.

List of OHL Executives of the Year

See also
 John Horman Trophy – Quebec Major Junior Hockey League Executive of the Year
 Lloyd Saunders Memorial Trophy – Western Hockey League Executive of the Year
 List of Canadian Hockey League awards

References

External links
 Ontario Hockey League

Ontario Hockey League trophies and awards
Awards established in 1990
Awards disestablished in 2013